Devathai is an Indian Tamil-language soap opera that airs on Sun TV from 1 July 2013 to 20 August 2016 at 12:00PM IST for 924 episodes. and starring by Subhadra, Bhagya, T. Durairaj and Shobana.

The show is produced by Abhinaya Creations Radha Krishnamurthy, director by P. Niravi pandiyan and Pa. Raghavan has written the story of Devathai, who is also taking care of its screenplay. The title track was composed by Balabharathi. The show stopped by Channel because of its low TRP ratings.

Plot
Devathai revolves around a woman who decides to make a fresh start in her happy life but her life journey is riddled with many challenges and complications that force her to hide her true identity.

Cast
 Subhadra as Purani 
 Bhagya.
Senu
Nithya Ravindran
Poorni as Nandhini
 T. Durairaj
 Shobana
 V. K. R. Raghunath
 T Durairaj
 R T Neason
 Havis
Jeevitha
 Deepa
 Delhi Ganesh (Former cast)
VJ Mounika
Swetha
Swetha Nair
Sai Madhavi

Original soundtrack

Title song
Famous music director of many films with number of hit songs, Balabharathi has composed the music for this serial. Kadhalmadhi has written the lyrics for his tune which is sung by popular playback singer Srinivas.

Soundtrack

Production
The series was directed by P. Niravi pandiyan. It was produced by Abhinaya Creations, along with the production crew of 2002-2016 Sun TV Serials Mangalyam, Adugiran Kannan, Theerka Sumangali, Chellamadi Nee Enakku, Thirupaavai, Anupallavi and Vellai Thamarai.

The show written and screenplay by Pa. Raghavan and Dialogues are written by Thavamani Vaseekaran. JK Acts as the creative head. As far as the technical department is concerned, camera work for this serial is well handled by M. Raja, editing by the duo K. Udayakumar and M. Premkumar. Sound recording responsibility is with Nellai D Rajkumar and J Senthilkumar.

See also
 List of programs broadcast by Sun TV

References

External links
 Official Website 
 Sun TV on YouTube
 Sun TV Network 
 Sun Group 

Sun TV original programming
2013 Tamil-language television series debuts
2010s Tamil-language television series
Tamil-language television shows
2016 Tamil-language television series endings